Rokhri is a town and union council of Mianwali District, in the Punjab province of Pakistan. It is located at 32°39'25N 71°30'37E

The town of Rokhri is situated in constituency NA-95, in 2018 general election Imran Khan, the prime minister of Pakistan was elected from this constituency.

Notable Niazis from Rokhri tribe

 Humair Hayat Khan Rokhri: Current politician, Sammad Khel 
 Aamir Hayat Khan Rokhri: Pakistani politician and member of the Punjab Provincial Assembly, Sammad Khel

References 

Union councils of Mianwali District
Populated places in Mianwali District